Man of the People is an American sitcom television series created by R.J. Stewart, starring James Garner that aired from September 15, 1991 to July 13, 1992. The supporting cast features Kate Mulgrew. The final two episodes of the series were produced but never broadcast.

Garner called the series "short lived and rightly so.""

Premise
A small-time grifter becomes a big hit when he fills in for his ex-wife at the city council.

Cast
James Garner as Jim Doyle
Kate Mulgrew as Mayor Lisbeth Chardin
Corinne Bohrer as Constance Leroy
George Wyner as Art Louie
Romy Walthall as Rita
Taylor Nichols as Richard Lawrence

Episodes

References

External links

1991 American television series debuts
1992 American television series endings
1990s American sitcoms
Television series by Universal Television
1990s American political television series
English-language television shows
NBC original programming
Television shows set in California